Ijede is a local council development area in Lagos State, Nigeria. 
The present chairman of her council is Hon. Motunrayo Gbadebo-Alogba.

Ijede Local Council Development Area is one of the 37 LCDAs created from the original 20 Local Governments in Lagos State by the Administration of Senator Bola Ahmed Tinubu (Jagaban Burgu) In the year 2003. Ijede Lcda was carved out from the old Ikorodu Local Government. The Lcda consists of the following communities: Ijede, Egbin, Oke Eletu, Ginti, Igbodu, Abule Eko, Igbopa, Ilupeju, Igbe Kapo, Igbe Ogunro, Igbe Oloja, Ayetoro, Ipakan, Iponmi, Ewu Owa, etc. The people are traditionally into agriculture.

The Lcda could also boast of the biggest Power Station in the West African Sub region. The Egbin Power Station. Ijede Lcda had been administered by both the elected Chairmen, Executive Secretaries as well as Sole Administrator since its inception 14 years ago. The Lcda has good arable land fertile enough to engage in massive mechanized farming as well as agricultural and agro allied businesses.

For a serene environment, Ijede is one of the best place to look for comfort after a long busy and tedious working day to cool ones down. A relaxation in any of the relaxation centers within Ijede Lcda will be a memorable experience that will not be forgotten in a hurry. There is peace and tranquility in and around Ijede and the people are very accommodating.

Ijede Lcda has 4 political wards namely Ward A B C and D. Ward A Consist of  Egbin, Ipakan, Ebute Olowo, while Ward B consist of Aledo, Oju Ayepe, Ayegbami, Etita, Oju Ogun, Itundesan, Oko Mabude. Ward C consist of Oke Oyinbo, Madan, Pacific, Welcome, Oko Ope, Igbe. While Ward D consist of Abule Eko, Igbopa, Oke Eletu, Gbodu, Igbodo Jabe, Ilupeju.

The council is presently headed by Alhaji Fatiu Salisu as the Executive Chairman. The Ijede Lcda is headquartered at No 1, Madan Street Ijede overlooking the lagoon serenity for which Lagos is known for.

History
Ijede as a community first had a taste of what it meant to be autonomous in modern administration in 1937 known as Ijede Native Authority with a District officer as the executive head.
In 1952 under the defunct western region administration of late Chief Obafemi Awolo, Ijede Local Council was deservedly gazetted.
The situation remained until 1976 as Ijede Local Council was merged with Ikorodu Local Government under the Military Government of General Olusegun Obasanjo.
In 1980 during the administration of Governor of Lagos State, Chief Lateef Kayode Jakande, Ijede was carved out of Ikorodu as Ikorodu constituency II into Irepodun Local Government headed by Chief Amusa.
It was during the administration of Gen. Ibrahim Babangida in 1985 that Irepodun Local Government was re-merged to Ikorodu Local Government. Ijede Local Government Area was later recreated in 2003, along with new 37 Local Council Development Areas during the administration of Gov. Ahmed Bola Tinubu, the Former Governor of Lagos State.

Location
Ijede Local Government was bounded in the East by Imota Local Development Council and in the North by Ikorodu North lcda and in the West Ikorodu Central and Igbogbo Bayeku Local Governments.

Inhabitants
The people of Ijede are predominant Ijebus but with other tribes like Igbo, Hausa and others residing in the community.

Occupations
The people of Ijede are known to be farmers & fisherman.

Population
The population of Ijede Local Council Area is around 1,600,000 according to the 2006 census.

Tourism
Ijede Local Council Development Area has a lot of Tourist attractions, such as Odoro Spring Water, Lagos Lagoon. Ijede can also boast of many hotels and relaxation centers.

TOWNS & VILLAGES: Oke-Eletu, Abule-Eko, Igbopa, Ipakan, Egbin and Ayetoro etc.

Industry
Ijede can not boast of any large industry except for sand dredging.

Education
There are 4 public primary schools and 1 secondary school with more than 40 private primary and secondary schools will be found at Ijede as at today.

HOSPITALS/HEALTH CENTRES: 
 Ijede Primary Health Centre Ijede, 
 Primary Health Centre Oke-Eletu
 Primary health Centre Abule-Eko<ref>{{cite web|url=http://www.ijedelcda.lg.gov.ng/about.php?

It plays host to the biggest thermal plant in Nigeria; Egbin Thermal Station

References

Local Government Areas in Lagos State